Skippack Bridge, also known as Montgomery County Bridge No. 142, is a historic stone arch bridge located near Evansburg in Lower Providence Township, Montgomery County, Pennsylvania. The bridge was built in 1792 and repaired in 1874. The bridge carries Germantown Pike across Skippack Creek.

It was listed on the National Register of Historic Places in 1970.

See also
List of bridges documented by the Historic American Engineering Record in Pennsylvania

References

External links

Road bridges on the National Register of Historic Places in Pennsylvania
Bridges in Montgomery County, Pennsylvania
Historic American Engineering Record in Pennsylvania
National Register of Historic Places in Montgomery County, Pennsylvania
Stone arch bridges in the United States